Zoraida Santiago (born June 22, 1982) is a Puerto Rican who medaled in Taekwondo at the 2007 Pan American Games and elsewhere.

References 

Puerto Rican female taekwondo practitioners
Taekwondo practitioners at the 2007 Pan American Games
Pan American Games bronze medalists for Puerto Rico
Pan American Games medalists in taekwondo
People from Salinas, Puerto Rico
1982 births
Living people
World Taekwondo Championships medalists
Medalists at the 2007 Pan American Games
21st-century Puerto Rican women